Theories of Flight is the twelfth studio album by progressive metal band Fates Warning, released on July 1, 2016 through Inside Out Music; their last release on the label with their re-signing with their longtime label Metal Blade Records in 2019. Theories of Flight marked the first time since 2004's FWX that Fates Warning had recorded as a four-piece. Although guitarist Frank Aresti was still a member of Fates Warning at the time of the album's writing and recording sessions, he does not appear in band photos inside the album booklet and is credited only as a guest, for providing guitar solos on two tracks ("From the Rooftops" and "White Flag"); therefore, this is the last Fates Warning album to feature Aresti.

Critical Reception
In his review of the album, Trey Spencer of Sputnik Music stated "Theories of Flight feels like a classic", arguing "when a band somehow manages to take the most solid and memorable moments of their breakthrough release and seamlessly mesh them with a sound they’ve been circling around for years, and do so flawlessly, then it is at least worth proclaiming that they’ve released a milestone within their own career. But is it worth stopping the discussion there; I don’t know? While it’s too early to start calling Theories of Flight another pinnacle of the progressive metal genre, in 10-years’ time that may very well be what this album has become."

Track listing

Personnel

Fates Warning
Ray Alder – lead vocals
Jim Matheos – guitar
Joey Vera – bass and backing vocals
Bobby Jarzombek – drums

Guests
Frank Aresti - guitar solos on "From the Rooftops" and "White Flag"
Mike Abdow - guitar solo on "White Flag"
Carina Tinker - spoken word samples on "Theories of Flight"

Charts

References

Fates Warning albums
2016 albums
Inside Out Music albums